William McMaster Murdoch, RNR (28 February 1873 – 15 April 1912) was a British sailor, who was the First Officer on the . He was the officer in charge on the bridge when the ship collided with an iceberg, and was one of the more than 1,500 people who died when the ship sank.

Life and career
Murdoch was born in Dalbeattie in Kirkcudbrightshire (now Dumfries and Galloway), Scotland, the fourth son of Captain Samuel Murdoch, a master mariner, and Jane Muirhead, six of whose children survived infancy. The Murdochs were a long and notable line of Scottish seafarers; his father and grandfather were both sea captains as were four of his grandfather's brothers.

Murdoch was educated first at the old Primary School in High Street, and then at the Dalbeattie High School in Alpine Street until he gained his diploma in 1887. Finishing schooling, he followed in the family seafaring tradition and was apprenticed for five years to William Joyce & Coy, Liverpool, but after four years (and four voyages) he was so competent that he passed his second mate's Certificate on his first attempt.

He served his apprenticeship aboard the Charles Cosworth of Liverpool, trading to the west coast of South America. From May 1895, he was First Mate on the St. Cuthbert, which sank in a hurricane off Uruguay in 1897. Murdoch gained his Extra Master's Certificate at Liverpool in 1896, at age 23. From 1897 to 1899, he was First Officer aboard the J. Joyce & Co. steel four-masted 2,534-ton barque Lydgate, that traded from New York to Shanghai.

An officer of the Royal Naval Reserve, he was employed by the White Star Line in 1900. From 1900 to 1912, Murdoch gradually progressed from Second Officer to First Officer and quickly rose to the rank of officer, serving on a successive number of White Star Line vessels, Medic (1900, along with Charles Lightoller, Titanics second officer), Runic (1901–1903), Arabic (1903), Celtic (1904), Germanic (1904), Oceanic (1905), Cedric (1906), Adriatic (1907–1911) and Olympic (1911–1912).

In 1903, Murdoch met a 29-year-old New Zealand school teacher named Ada Florence Banks en route to England on either the Runic or the Medic. They began to correspond regularly; on 2 September 1907 they were wed in Southampton at St Denys Church. The marriage register entry was witnessed by Captain William James Hannah and his wife and the addresses given by the bride and groom suggest they were lodging with the Hannahs. Captain Hannah came from a family of seafarers with their roots in Kircudbrightshire like Murdoch, and was Assistant Marine Superintendent for the White Star Line at Southampton. Hannah would see Murdoch for the last time when he witnessed the testing of lifeboats before Titanic departed from Southampton on 10 April 1912.

During 1903, Murdoch finally reached the stormy and glamorous North Atlantic run as Second Officer of the new liner Arabic. His cool head, quick thinking and professional judgement averted a disaster when a ship was spotted bearing down on the Arabic at night. His superior, Officer Fox, had ordered for the ship to steer "hard-a-port," but Murdoch rushed into the wheelhouse, brushed aside the quartermaster, and held the ship on course. The two ships barely missed each other by inches.

Intended to outclass the Cunard ships in luxury and size, it needed the most experienced large-liner crew that the White Star Line could find. Captain Edward J. Smith assembled a crew that included Henry Wilde as Chief Officer, Murdoch as First Officer, and Chief Purser Herbert McElroy. On 14 June 1911 Olympic departed on her maiden voyage to New York, with a planned arrival on 21 June.

On 20 September 1911, the Olympic collided with the Royal Navy cruiser HMS Hawke, badly damaging her hull. Since Murdoch was at his docking-station at the stern - a highly responsible position – he appeared at the incident inquiry and gave evidence. The collision was a major financial loss for the White Star Line, as the voyage to New York was abandoned and the ship returned to Belfast for repairs, which took six weeks.

Murdoch returned to the Olympic on 11 December 1911, serving in that capacity until March 1912. During that time, there were two further – though lesser – incidents, striking a sunken wreck and having to have a broken propeller replaced, and nearly running aground while leaving Belfast. Upon arriving in Southampton, Murdoch learned that his next assignment would be the Chief Officer of the Titanic, the Olympic sister ship, serving under Captain Edward J. Smith. Charles Lightoller later wrote that "three very contented chaps" headed north to Belfast, for he had been appointed First Officer, and their friend David Blair was set to be Second Officer. Awaiting them would be Joseph Groves Boxhall, as Fourth Officer, who had worked with Murdoch on the Adriatic.

Titanic

Murdoch, with an "ordinary master's certificate" and a reputation as a "canny and dependable man", had climbed through the ranks of the White Star Line to become one of its foremost senior officers. Murdoch was originally given the title Chief Officer for  maiden voyage. However, the captain, Edward Smith, brought Henry Wilde in as his Chief Officer (from a prior assignment), so Murdoch became the First Officer. Charles Lightoller was in turn reduced to Second Officer, and the original Second Officer, David Blair, would not sail with Titanic at all.

[[Image:Titanic Bridge and Crow's Nest.png|thumb|right|150px|Murdoch was on Titanic'''s bridge at the time of the impact.]]
At approximately 11:39 pm on 14 April 1912, First Officer Murdoch was in charge when a large iceberg which weighed up to 50 million tonnes directly in the Titanic's path was sighted. Quartermaster Robert Hichens, who was at the helm, and Fourth Officer Joseph Boxhall, who may or may not have been on the bridge at the time, both stated that Murdoch gave the order "Hard-a-starboard", a tiller command which would turn the ship to port (left) by moving the tiller to starboard (right).

At the time, steering instructions on British ships generally followed the way tillers on sailing vessels are operated, with turns in the opposite direction from the commands. As Walter Lord noted in The Night Lives On, this did not fully change to the "steering wheel" system of commands in the same directions as turns until 1924. This has led to rumours that Murdoch's orders were misinterpreted by the helmsman, resulting in a turn the wrong way.

Fourth Officer Boxhall testified that Murdoch set the ship's telegraph to "Full Astern", but Greaser Frederick Scott and Leading Stoker Frederick Barrett testified that the stoking indicators went from "Full" to "Stop". During or right before the collision, Quartermaster Alfred Olliver (who was walking onto the bridge during the collision) testified that he heard Murdoch give the order "Hard a'port" (moving the tiller all the way to the port (left) side turning the ship to starboard (right)) in what may have been an attempt to swing the remainder (aft section) away from the berg in a common manoeuvre called a "port around" (this could explain his comment to the captain "I intended to port around it"). The fact that such a manoeuvre was executed was supported by other crew members who testified that the stern of the ship never hit the iceberg. The orders that Murdoch gave to avoid the iceberg are debated. According to Oliver, Murdoch ordered the helm "hard to port" to ward off the stern of the iceberg. Hichens and Boxhall made no mention of the order. However, since the stern avoided the iceberg, it is likely that the order was given and carried out.

Despite these efforts, the ship made its fatal collision about 37 seconds after the iceberg had been sighted, opening the first six compartments. After the collision, Murdoch was put in charge of the starboard evacuation during which he launched ten lifeboats. He fired warning shots at Collapsible C during the loading process, in order to prevent a group of men swarming the Collapsible.  Murdoch perished in the disaster and his body was never recovered.

Death
Several eyewitnesses, including Third Class Passenger Eugene Daly and First Class passenger George Rheims, claimed to have seen one of the ship's officers shoot one or two men during a rush for a lifeboat, then shoot himself. It became widely rumoured that Murdoch was the officer. 
 
In a letter to Murdoch's widow, Second Officer Lightoller denied the rumours, writing that he saw Murdoch working to free Collapsible A when he was swept into the sea by the wave washing over the boat deck. However, Lightoller's testimony at the U.S inquiry suggests that he was not in a position to witness Murdoch being swept into the sea. It is also possible that Lightoller may have wanted to conceal the suicide, if it occurred, from Murdoch's widow. Later in life, and according to a family friend, Lightoller reportedly admitted that someone did die by suicide in the sinking. Additionally, James O. McGiffin, son of Captain James McGiffin (a close personal friend of Murdoch), said that Lightoller had told his father that Murdoch had shot a man.

The allegations of an officer's suicide was portrayed in the 1996 miniseries Titanic and the 1997 film Titanic, both portraying Murdoch as the suicide victim. When Murdoch's nephew Scott saw the film, he objected to the portrayal as damaging to Murdoch's heroic reputation, and film executives later flew to Murdoch's hometown to apologize. The film's director, James Cameron, said that the depiction was not meant to be negative, and added, "I'm not sure you'd find that same sense of responsibility and total devotion to duty today. This guy had half of his lifeboats launched before his counterpart on the port side had even launched one. That says something about character and heroism."

Author Tim Maltin writes that, although the evidence is circumstantial, "it does seem that an officer did shoot himself and Murdoch seems the most likely candidate. As Titanic experts Bill Wormstedt and Tad Fitch point out...Murdoch was the man directly in charge of the ship in the hours leading up to the collision with the iceberg and he was therefore responsible for the ship and all its passengers during that time. His career at sea was effectively over, even if he survived the disaster".

Legacy

Shortly after the sinking of the Titanic, the New York Herald published a story about Rigel, a dog reportedly owned by Murdoch who saved some of the survivors from the sinking. While the story was widely reproduced, contemporary analyses cast doubt on whether the dog actually existed.

In Murdoch's hometown of Dalbeattie, a memorial fund was created for the High School. Residents of the town had objected to and requested an apology for the depiction of Murdoch in the 1997 film Titanic. In April 1998, representatives from the film studio Twentieth Century Fox presented a £5000 cheque for the memorial fund, but did not offer a formal apology. The film's director, James Cameron, said that his depiction of Murdoch was not meant to be negative. In 2004, he tentatively said that "it was probably a mistake" to portray a specific person and could understand the family's objections.

In April 2012, Premier Exhibitions announced that it had identified Murdoch's belongings from a prior expedition to the wreck of the Titanic in 2000. There was a toiletry kit with Murdoch's initials embossed on it, a spare White Star Line officer's button, a straight razor, a shoe brush, a smoking pipe, and a pair of long johns. The items were recovered by David Concannon, Ralph White and Anatoly Sagalevitch diving in the Russian submersible Mir 1 in July 2000.

Portrayals
Theo Shall (1943) (Titanic)
Barry Bernard (1953) (Titanic)
Richard Leech (1958) (A Night to Remember)
Paul Young (1979) (S.O.S. Titanic) (TV Movie)
Stan Bocko (1989) (Pilots of the Purple Twilight) (A play by Steve Kluger)
Malcolm Stewart (1996) (Titanic) (TV Miniseries)
David Costabile (1997) (Titanic) (Broadway Musical)
Ewan Stewart (1997) (Titanic) 
Courtenay Pace (1998) (Titanic: Secrets Revealed) (TV Documentary)
Charlie Arneson (2003) (Ghosts of the Abyss) (Documentary)
Brian McCardie (2012) (Titanic) (TV series/4 episodes)
David McArdle (2016) (Pilots of the Purple Twilight) (A play by Steve Kluger)

ReferencesWilliam McMaster Murdoch, A Career at Sea''. By Susanne Störmer
Encyclopedia Titanica
Dalbeattie museum

Bibliography

External links
Dalbeattie Town History – Murdoch of the 'Titanic'
Murdoch -The Man, the Mystery

William McMaster Murdoch : Women and Children First Order

1873 births
1912 deaths
Deaths on the RMS Titanic
People from Dalbeattie
Royal Navy officers
Scottish sailors
British Merchant Navy officers
Royal Naval Reserve personnel